Journey (foaled 16 March 2012) is a Thoroughbred racehorse best known for winning the British Champions Fillies' and Mares' Stakes at Ascot on British Champions Day. It has been suggested she was named in reference to the band Journey.

Background
Journey was bred in by her owner George W. Strawbridge, Jr. and was sent to race in Europe where she is trained by John Gosden. She has been ridden in most of her races by Frankie Dettori.

Racing career

In 2016 as a four-year-old, Journey won the Pinnacle Stakes and then won the British Champions Fillies' and Mares' Stakes with Dettori as her jockey.

Journey, with jockey Dettori, raced again in the 2017 British Champions Filles' and Mares' Stakes on 21 October 2017. She started the race well but faded away towards the end finishing 6th. She was retired after the race.

Pedigree

References

External links
 Career 1-2-3 Colour Chart – Journey

2012 racehorse births
Racehorses bred in Pennsylvania
Racehorses trained in the United Kingdom
Thoroughbred family 9-f